Wendy Ruth Hawke  is a New Zealand adoption advocate. She has been the executive director of ICANZ (Inter-Country Adoption New Zealand) since 1995. In 2014 she was made an Officer of the New Zealand Order of Merit for her services to inter-country adoption.

References

Officers of the New Zealand Order of Merit
Living people
Adoption workers
20th-century New Zealand women
21st-century New Zealand women
Year of birth missing (living people)